John Claud Trewinard Oates FBA (1912–1990) was a librarian at the University of Cambridge, a trustee of the university, and president of the Bibliographical Society 1970–72. He was elected a fellow of the British Academy in 1976.

Selected publications
 Cambridge University Library: A historical sketch. Cambridge University Library, Cambridge, 1975.  (reprinted from The Encyclopedia of Library and Information Science, Vol. 4, Marcel Dekker, pp. 50–70.

References 

British librarians
Cambridge University Librarians
Fellows of the British Academy
1912 births
1990 deaths